Burn Your Fire for No Witness is the second studio album by American singer-songwriter Angel Olsen. It was released in February 2014 under Jagjaguwar Records. "Forgiven/Forgotten", "Hi-Five" and "Windows" were released as singles. A deluxe edition was released on November 18, 2014, with five additional tracks.

Critical reception

Burn Your Fire for No Witness garnered broadly positive reviews from critics. Turntable Kitchen called it "spellbinding and beautifully composed," while further describing it as "an album spilling over with heart-swelling and painfully visceral romance." The A.V. Club named it the best album of 2014. The Village Voices Pazz & Jop annual critics' poll named Burn Your Fire for No Witness the eighth-best album of 2014.

In December 2019, Pitchfork listed Burn Your Fire for No Witness as the 26th best album of the decade.

Track listing

Charts

References

2014 albums
Jagjaguwar albums
Albums produced by John Congleton
Angel Olsen albums